Gates House may refer to:

J. M. Gates House, Kingman	Arizona, NRHP-listed
Neil H. Gates House, Phoenix, Arizona, NRHP-listed
Gates House (Denver, Colorado), a Denver Landmark
Judge Louis Gates House, Kansas City, Kansas, NRHP-listed
Gates House (Machiasport, Maine), listed on the National Register of Historic Places
Gates House (Albion, Nebraska), designed by William Lang (architect)
Gates Homestead, Bolton, New York, NRHP-listed
Bill and Melinda Gates' House, Medina, Washington, a big house

Gates-Helm Farm, NRHP-listed
Gates-Livermore Cobblestone Farmhouse, NRHP-listed
Gates–Daves House, NRHP-listed

Benjamin Franklin Gates House, Albion, New York, NRHP-listed

Cyrus Gates Farmstead, Maine, New York, NRHP-listed
Gen. Horatio Gates House, and Golden Plough Tavern, York, Pennsylvania, NRHP-listed
Holsey Gates House, Bedford, Ohio, NRHP-listed
C. E. "Pop" Gates House, Medford, Oregon

Russell and Elinor Gates Mansion, Denver, Colorado, NRHP-listed
Seth M. Gates House, Warsaw, New York, NRHP-listed
Gates-Helm Farm, Snowball, Arkansas, NRHP-listed
Gates-Livermore Cobblestone, Mendon, New York, NRHP-listed
Gates-Daves House, Mobile	Alabama, NRHP-listed
Groat-Gates House, Portland, Oregon, NRHP-listed
H.W. Gates Funeral Home, Kansas City, Kansas, NRHP-listed
Rice-Gates House, Hillsboro, Oregon, NRHP-listed